Leadburn railway station served the hamlet of Leadburn, Midlothian, Scotland from 1855 to 1962 on the Peebles Railway.

History 
The station opened on 4 July 1855 by the Peebles Railway. The station was situated on the south side of the A6094 east of its junction with A701 and A703. There was a siding running behind the up platform but the goods yard was on the north side of the down platform and consisted of two sidings, both of which served a small goods dock. After the Dolphinton branch closed in April 1933, the lines used in the bay platforms were converted into two additional goods sidings. The station closed to passengers on 7 March 1955 and remained open to goods traffic until the closure of the line on 5 February 1962.

References

External links 

Disused railway stations in Midlothian
Former North British Railway stations
Railway stations in Great Britain opened in 1855
Railway stations in Great Britain closed in 1955
1855 establishments in Scotland
1962 disestablishments in Scotland